The Regadera Formation (E2r, Tpr) is a geological formation of the Bogotá savanna, Altiplano Cundiboyacense, Eastern Ranges of the Colombian Andes.

Etymology 
The formation was first described by Hubach in 1931 as part of the Usme Formation and redefined and named in 1963 by Julivert after the La Regadera Reservoir.

Description

Lithologies 
The Regadera Formation consists mainly of quartz arenitic sandstone and conglomerates with some shale beds.

Stratigraphy and depositional environment 
The Regadera Formation overlies the Bogotá Formation and is overlain by the Usme and Tilatá Formations. The age has been estimated, based on palynological data of Echitriporites trianguliformis var. orbicularis, Nothofagidites sp. and Multiporopollenites pauciporatus, to be Middle to Late Eocene. The depositional environment has been interpreted as a braided river setting.

Outcrops 

The Regadera Formation is apart from its type locality in the synclinal of Usme, the valley of the Tunjuelo River, found in the synclinal of Sisga. In the Tunjuelo River valley, the Regadera Formations is present in the escarpments on the river banks.

Regional correlations

See also 
  Geology of the Eastern Hills
  Geology of the Ocetá Páramo
  Geology of the Altiplano Cundiboyacense

Notes and references

Notes

References

Bibliography

Maps

External links 
 

Geologic formations of Colombia
Paleogene Colombia
Eocene Series of South America
Divisaderan
Mustersan
Casamayoran
Bartonian Stage
Lutetian Stage
Priabonian Stage
Sandstone formations
Conglomerate formations
Fluvial deposits
Formations
Geography of Cundinamarca Department
Geography of Bogotá